The Munak Canal is a 102 kilometer long aqueduct that is part of Western Yamuna Canal in Haryana and Delhi states in India. The canal conveys water from the Yamuna River at Munak regulator in Karnal district of Haryana and travels in a southerly direction via Khubru barrage and Mandora barrage, terminating at Haidarpur in Delhi. It is one of the primary sources of drinking water for Delhi. A memorandum of understanding was signed between the Haryana and Delhi governments in 1996 and the Canal was constructed by Haryana between 2003 and 2012 on payment by Delhi. Originally a porous trench, the canal was eventually cemented due to excess seepage, saving 80 million gallons of water per day.

Disruptions
In February 2016, the canal was disrupted by the Jats during their agitation, which led to potential water crises in Delhi. Control of the canal was taken over by the Indian Army to restore the water supply.

See also

 Indira Gandhi Canal
 Irrigation in India 
 Indian Rivers Inter-link
 Inland waterways of India
 Ganges Canal
 Ganges Canal (Rajasthan)
 Upper Ganges Canal Expressway
 Blue Bird Lake, Hisar (city)
 Kaushalya Dam in Pinjore 
 Bhakra Dam
 Hathni Kund Barrage
 Tajewala Barrage
 Okhla Barrage - Western Yamuna Canal begins here 
 Surajkund
 Neher water system

References

Canals in Haryana
Irrigation in Haryana
Yamunanagar district
Buildings and structures in Delhi
Canals in India